Cochran is a populated location in Dearborn County, Indiana, in the United States.

History
A post office was established at Cochran in 1858, and remained in operation until it was discontinued in 1917. Cochran was named for its founder, George W. Cochran.

References

Populated places in Dearborn County, Indiana